The Tower Subway is a tunnel beneath the River Thames in central London, between Tower Hill on the north bank of the river and Vine Lane (off Tooley Street) on the south. In 1869 a  circular tunnel was dug through the London clay using a cast iron shield, an idea that had been patented in 1864 by Peter W. Barlow but never built.

A  narrow gauge railway was laid in the tunnel and from August 1870 a cable-hauled wooden carriage conveyed passengers from one end to the other. This was uneconomic and the company went bankrupt by the end of the year. The tunnel was converted to pedestrian use and one million people a year crossed under the river, paying a toll of a ha'penny. The opening of the toll-free Tower Bridge nearby in 1894 caused a drop in income and the tunnel closed in 1898, after being sold to the London Hydraulic Power Company. Today the tunnel is used for water mains and telecommunications cables.

The same shield method of construction was used in 1890 to dig the tunnels of the City and South London Railway, the first of London's electrified "Tube" railways and the first underground electrified railway in the world.

History

Construction 
In 1864 Peter Barlow patented a method of tunnelling using a circular cast iron shield and to fill the gap between the tunnel lining and wall with lime or cement to prevent settling of the surrounding ground. Unfortunately, Barlow failed to explain how he intended to fill such gaps between shield and tunnel wall with grout. He published a pamphlet in 1867 suggesting a network of tunnels with cars carrying up to twelve people. In 1868 authority was obtained for a tunnel under the Thames between Great Tower Hill and Pickle Herring Stairs near Vine Street (now Vine Lane), but there was a delay finding a contractor due to recent experiences with the Thames Tunnel until his former pupil James Henry Greathead tendered for £9,400. Whilst Barlow patented his idea in 1864 for a tunnelling shield, he never constructed it: Greathead was accredited with the first shield construction for what is now known as the Tower Gateway complex in 1869. According to William Copperthwaite, who once worked under Greathead, both Greathead in England and Alfred Ely Beach in New York invented and constructed their own versions of tunnelling shields simultaneously and independently of each other.

The tunnelling itself started in April using the circular Greathead shield.

Whilst many argue that the shield used was a "Barlow–Greathead" shield, William Copperthwaite says "... in 1868 [Barlow] provisionally patented a shield having near the cutting edge a transverse partition or diaphragm. Neither of these designs took practical form, and in 1869 Greathead in England and Beach in New York actually built and used shields having many features in common with Barlow's patents but differing from each other in details... Beach's shield resembled Barlow's patent of 1864, and Greathead's the provisional patent of 1868." Copperthwaite puts to bed all arguments over origins of tunnelling shields as being the patented but unimplemented idea of Barlow's in 1864 but the actual construction of a different patented device by Greathead was built and first used on the Tower Subway and simultaneously in New York, Beach created and made his own shield independently of Barlow's and Greathead's designs. Barlow lost out on credit because he never actually constructed one, only patenting the idea. Copperthwaite also reveals that Greathead was unaware of the 1868 provisional patent of Barlow's until 1895, a fact discussed in an 1895 Institution of Civil Engineers paper on the City and South London Railway acknowledged by Barlow.

This, combined with the simpler nature of the project – the excavation face was only one twentieth that of the Thames Tunnel – enabled faster progress. Screw jacks drove the shield forward at a rate of  each week. The under-river section was dug in fourteen weeks and the tunnel completed in December 1869.

Cable railway 

The entrance shafts were fitted with steam-powered lifts for passengers. The tunnel was laid with  gauge railway track and a single car, carrying a maximum of 12 passengers, cable-hauled by two  stationary steam engines, one on each side of the river.

The tunnel was completed by February 1870, and a press launch was held the following April. The underground railway opened for public use on 2 August 1870 charging 2d for first class and 1d for second class, first class ticket holders merely having priority for the lifts and when boarding. However, the system was unreliable and uneconomic. The company went into receivership in November 1870, and the railway closed on 7 December 1870, four months after opening.

Foot tunnel 
The railcar and steam engines were removed, gaslights installed and the passenger lifts replaced with spiral staircases. The tunnel opened to pedestrians on 24 December 1870 at a toll of d and became a popular way to cross the river, averaging 20,000 people a week (one million a year). Its main users were described as "the working classes who were formerly entirely dependent on the ferries". In September 1888 the subway briefly achieved notoriety after a man with a knife was seen in the tunnel at the time when Jack the Ripper was committing murders in nearby Whitechapel.

In his Dictionary of London, Charles Dickens Jr commented on the smallness of the tunnel: "there is not much head-room left, and it is not advisable for any but the very briefest of Her Majesty's lieges to attempt the passage in high-heeled boots, or with a hat to which he attaches any particular value."

The Italian writer Edmondo De Amicis (1846–1908) gave a description of a passage through the subway in his Jottings about London:

In 1894 the toll-free Tower Bridge opened a few hundred yards downriver, causing a drop in the subway's income. In 1897, Parliament passed a local act authorising the sale of the tunnel to the London Hydraulic Power Company (LHPC) for £3,000 (worth over £ in ), and the subway closed to pedestrian traffic in 1898.

Utility tunnel 
After its closure, the tunnel gained a new purpose as a route for hydraulic power mains operated by the LHPC and for water mains. It was damaged during the Second World War when a German bomb fell in the river near Tower Pier in December 1940, and exploded on the river bed very close to the tunnel's roof. During the course of repair work, it was found that – apart from the bomb damage – the tunnel had survived seventy years of use in excellent condition.

The subway today 
While it is no longer used for hydraulic tubes, the tunnel still carries water mains. The hydraulic tubes, once a major source of power in the centre of London, have since been replaced by fibre optic telecommunications links.

A small round entrance building survives at Tower Hill near the Tower of London's ticket office, a short distance to the west of the main entrance to the Tower. This is not the original entrance but was built in 1926 by the London Hydraulic Power Company, with a ring of lettering giving the original date of construction and naming the LHPC. The entrance on the south bank of the Thames was demolished in the 1990s, and a new one has been built in its place. It is located just behind the Unicorn Theatre on Tooley Street, but there is no plaque to mark the site.

A video inside the tunnel from the current owners, Vodafone was released in March 2023.

See also
Tunnels underneath the River Thames
List of crossings of the River Thames

References

External links 

 
 
 
 

Buildings and structures in the London Borough of Southwark
Buildings and structures in the London Borough of Tower Hamlets
History of the London Borough of Southwark
History of the London Borough of Tower Hamlets
Tunnels underneath the River Thames
2 ft 6 in gauge railways in England
Tunnels completed in 1869
Former toll tunnels
1869 establishments in England
Pedestrian tunnels in the United Kingdom